The Total effective dose equivalent (TEDE) is a radiation dosimetry quantity defined by the US Nuclear Regulatory Commission to monitor and control human exposure to ionizing radiation. It is defined differently in the NRC regulations and NRC glossary. According to the regulations, it is the sum of effective dose equivalent from external exposure and committed effective dose equivalent from internal exposure, thereby taking into account all known exposures. However, the NRC glossary defines it as the sum of the deep-dose equivalent and committed effective dose equivalent, which would appear to exclude the effective dose to the skin and eyes from non-penetrating radiation such as beta. These surface doses are included in the NRC's shallow dose equivalent, along with contributions from penetrating (gamma) radiation.

Regulatory limits are imposed on the TEDE for occupationally exposed individuals and members of the general public.

See also

Radioactivity
Radiation poisoning
Ionizing radiation
Deep-dose equivalent
Collective dose
Cumulative dose
Committed dose equivalent
Committed effective dose equivalent

References

10 CFR 20.1003

External links
  - "The confusing world of radiation dosimetry" - M.A. Boyd, U.S. Environmental Protection Agency. An account of chronological differences between USA and ICRP dosimetry systems.

Radioactivity
Radiation health effects